Brad McEwan (born 28 April 1971) is an Australian television presenter and sports journalist.

McEwan has previously been a sport presenter on the Brisbane, Sydney and Melbourne editions of 10 News First and is best known for his hosting duties on Network Ten's Sports Tonight.

Early life
McEwan grew up in Lockington, a small town close to Echuca in Northern Victoria. He is a former student of Rochester High School and then Ballarat College of Advanced Education (now the Federation University Australia) where he studied Physical Education.

Career

Radio
In 1994, Brad commenced a four-year period at Triple M in Melbourne where he worked in the newsroom as a sports reporter and presenter.

Television
McEwan's entry into television arrived in 1999 when he commenced work with Network Ten in Melbourne as a sports reporter.  He reported and presented sport for Ten in Melbourne (where he was a substitute for Stephen Quartermain).

In 2004, Brad moved to Brisbane where he was a sport presenter, producer and writer with Ten News and he also filled in as a news presenter. McEwan replaced Bill McDonald who became news presenter on the bulletin.  Additionally, McEwan hosted Queensland's local AFL show Queensland Rules, and commentated from the boundary for many of the AFL games held in Brisbane.

In late 2006, Network Ten welcomed the new format of Ten Late News with Sports Tonight, which saw Brad move to Sydney in 2007. McEwan replaced Ryan Phelan becoming the main presenter of Sports Tonight. 

In 2008, Brad became the permanent replacement for Tim Webster as sport presenter on Sydney's Ten News at Five.

In August 2008, McEwan injured his knee when attempting to take a mark over a marking bag while filming an AFL segment for the news resulting in his admission to hospital and surgery. He returned to work in 2009 after signing a 4-year contract extension with Network Ten. 

In September 2013, it was announced that he would return to Melbourne to present sport on Ten Eyewitness News replacing Stephen Quartermain.

In 2014, McEwan hosted the overnight session on Network Ten of the Sochi 2014 Winter Olympics

In February 2018, McEwan stepped down from sport presenting duties on 10 News First Melbourne. His final bulletin was on 27 April 2018. He remains with the network on a freelance basis.

References

External links
 

10 News First presenters
Living people
People from Victoria (Australia)
1971 births
Federation University Australia alumni
Australian sports journalists
Australian sports broadcasters
Australian game show hosts